Mohamed Sadik Coubageat (born 16 November 1982 in Lomé) is a retired Togolese football midfielder.

He was a member of the Togo national football team making 21 appearances.

External links
 

1982 births
Living people
Togolese footballers
Togolese expatriate footballers
Togo international footballers
FC Wangen bei Olten players
FC Grenchen players
BSC Young Boys players
SC Young Fellows Juventus players
2000 African Cup of Nations players
Expatriate footballers in Switzerland
Association football midfielders
21st-century Togolese people